The Wakodahatchee Wetlands is a park located in Delray Beach, Florida. The boardwalk has interpretive signage as well as gazebos with benches along the way. This site is part of the South section of the Great Florida Birding Trail and offers many opportunities to observe birds in their natural habitats.

Water reclamation
Each day, the Palm Beach County Water Utilities Department’s Southern Region Water Reclamation Facility pumps approximately two million gallons of 90% treated water into the Wakodahatchee Wetlands. This water, which is free of organic contaminants but still contains excess mineral content, is naturally purified by the plants and algae in the wetlands, then released into the surface water supply.

Fauna
Over 150 species of birds have been spotted inside the park, including wood stork, pied-billed grebe, snowy egrets, and black-bellied whistling ducks. The park is also home to turtles, alligators, rabbits, frogs, and raccoons.

Flora
Plants within the park include pond apple, sabal palm, live oak, pickerelweed, duckweed, and giant bulrush.

References
Wakodahatchee Wetlands brochure

Gallery

External links

Delray Beach, Florida
Parks in Palm Beach County, Florida
Wetlands of Florida
Landforms of Palm Beach County, Florida